Jennifer Rush is the sixth studio album by American singer Jennifer Rush. Released in Europe in October 1992, the album features songwriters and producers such as Rick Nowels, Ellen Shipley and Desmond Child. Jennifer Rush proved less of a hit than her previous work and peaked at number 28 on the Danish Albums Chart. Singles released were "Never Say Never", "A Broken Heart" and "Vision of You," a cover of the Belinda Carlisle song.

Track listing

Spanish CD copies of the album include 4 spanish re-recordings added to the track list.

Charts

References

External links

1992 albums
Jennifer Rush albums
Albums produced by Rick Nowels
EMI Records albums
Albums recorded at MSR Studios